Piero Liatti (born 7 May 1962) is an Italian rally driver. His specialty was driving on tarmac rallies like Monte Carlo, Catalunya, Corsica and the San Remo Rally.

At the end of season 2021, Liatti is the last Italian driver to win a race in the World Rally Championship.

Biography
His WRC career began as a private entrant, driving a Lancia Delta Integrale, then a Subaru Impreza. His exploits in the Subaru in 1994 caught the eye of the Prodrive Subaru team and he was signed by then for 1995 through to 1998. A year each with SEAT, Ford and Hyundai team followed before, in 2002 he found himself without a works drive.  2003 saw him return to the WRC, albeit as a private entrant in a Super 1600 class Peugeot 206.

The highlight of his career was in 1996 when he came 5th in the World Rally Championship with the Subaru 555 team gaining no less than 56 points. Other highlights were wins in the Sanremo rally in 1995 (although that year, the event was not a round of the WRC) and the Monte Carlo rally in 1997.

WRC results

Victories

Results

Summary

References

External links
WRC Archive Stat page
rallybase stat page

1962 births
Living people
World Rally Championship drivers
Italian rally drivers
European Rally Championship drivers
Hyundai Motorsport drivers
Cupra Racing drivers